Irma Yakovlevna Raush (born 21 April 1938) is a Russian actress and the first wife of film director Andrei Tarkovsky. She is best known for her role as Durochka in Andrei Rublev and as Ivan's mother in Ivan's Childhood.

Biography

Irma Raush was born in Saratov on 21 April 1938 into a Volga German family. In 1954, she began to study at the State Institute of Cinematography (VGIK) under Mikhail Romm. She was one of two women in the fifteen strong class of students who wanted to be film directors. Andrei Tarkovsky was also in the same class and she became his supporter and she married him in April 1957. On 30 September 1962, their son Arseny Tarkovsky was born. They divorced in June 1970. Tarkovsky remarried.

Irma Raush played several roles in Tarkovsky's early films. She played Ivan's mother in Ivan's Childhood in 1962 and Durochka in Andrei Rublev. For the latter role she was awarded the Étoile de Cristal in 1970 for best foreign actress. The Étoile de Cristal was a French film award and predecessor to the César Award. In 1970, she became a film director for the Gorky Film Studio. After finishing her film career, she began to write children's books.

Filmography

As actress

 1962 - Ivan's Childhood (Ivan's mother)
 1966 - Andrei Rublev (Durochka)
 1967 - Doktor Vera

As director

 1969 - Zhenya
 1974 - Let Him Stay With Us
 1975 - Peasant Son
 1981 - A Tale Told at Night
 1982 - The Adventures of Dunno
 1986 - Steppe Squadron

References

External links
 

Andrei Tarkovsky
Gerasimov Institute of Cinematography alumni
Russian film actresses
Russian people of German descent
Soviet film actresses
Soviet film directors
1938 births
Living people